Neoleucinodes elegantalis is a moth of the family Crambidae described by Achille Guenée in 1854. It ìs found in Mexico, Costa Rica, Cuba, Honduras, Grenada, Guatemala, Jamaica, Panama, Puerto Rico, Trinidad and Tobago, Argentina, Brazil, Colombia, Ecuador, Guyana, Paraguay, Peru, Suriname, Uruguay and Venezuela.

There are multiple generations per year. Eggs are laid either singly or in clusters on the petiole or sepals of flowers and the calyx of fruit.

The larvae feed by burrowing into the fruit of Solanum species, including Solanum lycopersicum, Solanum melongena, Solanum aethiopicum, Solanum betaceum, Solanum quitoense, Solanum sessiliflorum, Solanum acerifolium, Solanum atropurpureum, Solanum crinitum, Solanum torvum, Solanum hirtum, Solanum lycocarpum, Solanum pseudolulo, Solanum viarum and Solanum sisymbriifolium, as well as Capsicum annuum. They feed on the flesh and seed of the fruit.

Pupation takes place outside of the fruit. Larvae may fold over the edge of a leaf, or burrow into loose soil at the base of the plant.

References

External links

Moths described in 1854
Spilomelinae